One ship of the Royal Navy has borne the name HMS St Fiorenzo, whilst another was planned:

  was a 38-gun fifth rate, formerly the French ship Minerve.  She was captured in 1794, having been scuttled.  She was raised, placed on harbour service from 1812 and broken up in 1837.
 HMS St Fiorenzo was to have been a wood screw frigate.  She was laid down in 1850 but cancelled in 1856.

Royal Navy ship names